Machuelo Arriba is one of the 31 barrios of the municipality of Ponce, Puerto Rico.  Along with the barrios of Magueyes, Tibes, Portugués, Montes Llanos, Maragüez, and Cerrillos, Machuelo Arriba is one of the municipality's seven rural interior barrios. It was established in 1831.

Location

Machuelo Arriba is a rural barrio located in the central section of the municipality, just north of the Ponce city limits at latitude 18.043976N, and longitude -66.597924W.

Boundaries
It is bounded on the North by the hills north of Camino El Cedro I Road, on the South by Tito Castro Avenue/PR-14 (roughly), on the West by PR-504, by the hills west of PR-505, and Rio Portugues, and on the East by Pinto Peak, and Río Cerrillos.

In terms of barrio-to-barrio boundaries, Machuelo Arriba is bounded on the North by Barrios Maragüez and Monte Llano, on the South by Machuelo Abajo, on the West by Barrios Portugués and Portugués Urbano, and on the East by Maragüez and Cerrillos.

Features and demographics

The communities of La Cuchilla, La Yuca, El Paraiso, Glenview Gardens, Quintas de Monserrate, Villa Machuelo, and Santa Teresita are found here. The communities of Jardines de Ponce and Las Monjitas are also located within the limits of barrio Machuelo Arriba.

In 2010, the population of Machuelo Arriba was 12,412. The population density in Machuelo Arriba was 1,897.9 persons per square mile.

The main roads in barrio Machuelo Arriba are PR-10 on its southern part, and PR-505 and PR-139 which serve the rest of the barrio.

The highest point in Barrio Machuelo Arriba is Pico Pinto  which stands at 2,037 feet.

Landmarks
The Río Bucaná springs from Barrio Machuelo Arriba (as Rio Bayagan) and runs for  into the Caribbean Sea.

See also

 List of communities in Puerto Rico

References

External links

Barrio Machuelo Arriba
1831 establishments in Puerto Rico